Reema bint Bandar Al Saud (born 15 February 1975) is a member of House of Saud and the Saudi Arabian ambassador to the United States. She took office as ambassador on 23 February 2019—becoming the first female envoy in the country's history. She has advocated for female empowerment and has worked to expand opportunities for Saudi women within the Kingdom.

Early life and education
Reema bint Bandar was born in Riyadh in 1975. Her parents are Bandar bin Sultan and Haifa bint Faisal. Reema is the great-granddaughter of Ibn Saud, the founder of modern Saudi Arabia, on her maternal and paternal sides. Her maternal grandparents are King Faisal, the son of Ibn Saud, and Queen Iffat who was born to a Turkish mother and a Saudi father. Her paternal grandfather is former Crown Prince Sultan.

She is one of eight children. Two of her siblings also work in government: Khalid bin Bandar bin Sultan Al Saud is the Saudi Arabian ambassador to the United Kingdom and Faisal bin Bandar bin Sultan Al Saud is the chairman of the Saudi Arabian Federation for Electronic and Intellectual Sports (SAFEIS).

Reema spent many years in the United States where her father, Bandar, was the ambassador from 1983–2005. She graduated from George Washington University with a Bachelor of Arts degree in museum studies. While Reema was earning her degree in museum studies, she interned at L'Institut du Monde Arabe in Paris and at the Sackler Gallery of Art in Washington, D.C. She also collaborated from a distance with a curator at the Field Museum in Chicago, while her mother's "Haifa Faisal Collection" of art was displayed there.

After graduation, she returned to Riyadh. She joined THNK School of Creative Leadership in 2014 as a participant of Class 5 2015.

Career

Private sector 
Reema returned to Saudi Arabia in 2005. She co-founded Yibreen, a women's day gym and spa. She later assumed the role of CEO at Al Hama LLC, a luxury retail corporation. She served for several years as the CEO of Alfa International, a leading luxury retail corporation that, among other pursuits, operates the Harvey Nichols store in Riyadh.

As the CEO of Harvey Nichols in Riyadh, Reema led the inclusion of women into the retail sector, working closely with the Ministry of Labor to craft a smooth labor market entry. She set the example of workforce integration by creating the Kingdom's first workplace nursery, enabling more women to work. 
 
Reema is the founder and creative director of Baraboux, a luxury handbag brand that she launched in 2013.

In 2013, Reema also founded Alf Khair, a social enterprise aimed at elevating the professional capital of Saudi women. One of its keystone initiatives, 10KSA, introduced the concept of holistic health awareness for a healthier Saudi community. The year-long campaign culminated into the World's Largest Human Awareness Ribbon, entering into the Guinness World Records.

Reema is a member of The World Bank's advisory council for the Women Entrepreneurs Finance Initiative.

In 2021, she founded "Catmosphere Foundation" to support Panthera Corporation's work to preserve big cats. On 6 November 2021, the first awareness campaign "Catwalk" took place, a walkathon in several countries.

Public sector
As president of the Mass Participation Federation, Reema is the first woman to lead a multi-sports federation in the Kingdom, driving communities towards a more active lifestyle.

In 2016 Reema served as the Saudi General Sports Authority's (GSA) Deputy of Planning and Development, where she has led diversity and inclusion, the development of the Kingdom's sports economy, and strategic partnerships. In the very same year, she was appointed as vice president of women's affairs at the General Sports Authority (GSA). In 2017, she held the position of the president of the Saudi Federation for Community Sports.

Among the first achievements under Reema's mandate, is the inclusion of physical education for girls in schools.

In 2017 Reema was awarded Sheikh Mohammed bin Rashid Al Maktoum Creative Sport Award in its ninth edition for her role played in the empowerment of women in the region through her spirit of entrepreneurship and philanthropy.

Reema is a member of the International Olympic Committee (IOC) Women in Sports Commission and a member of the Saudi Arabian Olympic Committee. She is also a permanent representative to the (UNESCO). Princess Reema has also been nominated to become a full member of the International Olympic Committee.

In October 2019, Reema sent Rosh Hashanah greetings to Jews in the United States wishing them a happy and sweet Jewish new year. This is the first time, according to NBC news, the Saudi embassy in Washington sent such a greeting to American Jews.

Leadership in business innovation and inclusive employment advocacy
Reema has gained attention on the international stage as a leader in business innovation, specifically as a champion for women in the workplace. She was recognized as the Most Creative Person of the year in 2014 by Fast Company for "Inviting Women into the Workforce," and was featured on the Forbes lists of the 200 Most Powerful Arab Women and Most Powerful Arab Women in Saudi Arabia lists for 2014. She was also recognized by Foreign Policy Magazine as a Leading Global Thinker of 2014 in their "Moguls" category for her work helping women to "integrate their personal and professional lives" by creating hospitable opportunities for women to participate in the economy. Sheikha Reema was listed in the 'Top 100 most powerful Arabs' from 2018 to 2021 by Gulf Business.

Reema has noted publicly that engaging women as active participants in the working economy is "evolution, not revolution," and empowering a woman with financial responsibility will encourage her to "explore more of the world for herself and become less dependent." She has also stated that Saudi Arabia "cannot have half of [the] population not working."

At Harvey Nichols Riyadh, Reema was responsible for hiring more women and introducing services such as childcare available to employees with young children, providing an opportunity for mothers to continue working and also provide for their children during the workday. She also began a program at Harvey Nichols that provides transportation stipends to women because the Kingdom's restrictions did not allow women to drive at that time, until September 2017 when the Saudi government decided to allow women to drive. These efforts, coupled with economic policies lowering the barriers for women to enter the workforce, have led to the store employing dozens of women today (as opposed to 2011, when only men worked there).

Philanthropic work
Reema Alf Khair, a corporate social responsibility initiative, whose work included an active and vocal community of creative talent in Saudi Arabia and promoted their work internationally. Alf Khair also developed a retail academy, which provided training for Saudi women joining the workforce.  Her work in this realm also included her role as an Advisory Board Member of the Saudi National Creative Initiative.

Breast cancer advocacy
Reema is a founding member of the Zahra Breast Cancer Awareness Association, based in Riyadh. The mission of the organization is to "increase and spread awareness among women across the country for early detection, prevention, and treatment of the disease, and cooperate with women diagnosed with breast cancer on a step-by-step basis for treatment and ultimate recovery."

Reema's work with Zahra also includes organizing the world's largest human pink ribbon in 2010. This effort was recognized as the winner of the Holmes Report Golden Sabre Award for the Best Publicity Stunt Category and the Platinum Sabre Award for Best PR Programme.

In May 2012, in conjunction with the Zahra Breast Cancer Association, Reema led a group of Saudi women to the Base Camp of Mount Everest, in a bid to raise breast cancer awareness. The cancer awareness campaign has been entitled ‘A Woman’s Journey: Destination Mount Everest.’ The 11 climbers began their trek to Base Camp located 5,364 meters above sea level on 7 May, completing their trek in 12 days.

Personal life
Reema married Faisal bin Turki bin Nasser and had two children (a son, Turki; and a daughter, Sarah). They divorced in 2012.

Ancestry

Recognition and Awards 
 In 2015, Reema bint Bandar was selected by the World Economic Forum at Davos as a Young Global Leader.
 In 2014, she was named as Foreign Policy Magazine Global Thinker Mogul.
 In 2014, she was a Leadership and Innovation Delegate to the Academy of Achievement’s 51st International Achievement Summit.

References

External links

1975 births
Reema
Columbian College of Arts and Sciences alumni
Reema
Living people
Reema
Reema
Reema
Reema
Women ambassadors